Victor Hugo de Medeiros da Silva (born 30 June 1991), known as Victor Hugo, is a Brazilian footballer who plays as an attacking midfielder.

Club career
Born in Jaboatão dos Guararapes, Pernambuco, Victor Hugo joined Santa Cruz in December 2009, after leaving Náutico. He made his first team debut for the former on 11 April 2010, in a 2–2 away draw against Araripina for the year's Campeonato Pernambucano.

Victor Hugo scored his first senior goal on 4 July 2010, netting the opener in a 1–1 Copa do Nordeste away draw against Sergipe. After two goals in 15 matches, he left the club and joined Santos on loan in November 2010, after signing a contract with a group of businessmen who assigned his economic rights to Pinheiros-SC.

After failing to make an appearance for Santos, Victor Hugo terminated his deal in May 2011, and subsequently moved to ABC. He signed for Uberaba in 2012, after a trial period at Bangu, before returning to Santa on 5 June of that year.

After featuring rarely, Victor Hugo agreed to a contract with Boa Esporte for the 2013 campaign, but moved to Camboriú after failing to play; in that year, he also represented Juazeiro. He would spend most of the 2014 and 2015 campaigns nursing knee injuries He returned to play for São Raimundo-PA in 2016, spending another season without playing before joining Salgueiro for the 2018 campaign.

Career statistics

References

External links

1991 births
Living people
Sportspeople from Pernambuco
Brazilian footballers
Association football midfielders
Campeonato Brasileiro Série C players
Campeonato Brasileiro Série D players
Santa Cruz Futebol Clube players
Santos FC players
ABC Futebol Clube players
Uberaba Sport Club players
Boa Esporte Clube players
Camboriú Futebol Clube players
Juazeiro Social Clube players
Clube Atlético Juventus players
Salgueiro Atlético Clube players